Kingdom O' Magic is a video game released by Sales Curve Interactive in 1996. It is a comedic point and click adventure game parodying fantasy fiction. It can be played with either of two available protagonists, Thidney or Sha-ron.

Kingdom O' Magic was planned for release on four different systems: MS-DOS, PlayStation, Macintosh, and Sega Saturn. However, only the MS-DOS version was ever released.

Themes
The game, penned by television writer Alan Silberberg, is filled with surreal humor. For instance, the instruction manual claims that the game was "First published in 1876 under the title '101 fun things To Do with Trolls'. However the version on CD-ROM is specially calibrated for short people with red hair."

It was designed by Fergus McNeill. As in his previous games, Bored of the Rings and The Boggit, the game parodies J. R. R. Tolkien's Middle-earth. Various elements in the games are parodies of Middle-earth characters and locations, such as "The High Steward of Minar Tragedy, Don Elrondo of Rivendull and Queen Galadrag of De-Lorean.

The game's closing credits sequence plays the theme to the 1970s British cartoon Roobarb, but there appears to be no other relationship between the works.

Plot
Beginning the game, the player can select between two protagonists: Thidney the Lizard Bloke (voiced by John Sessions) or Shah-Ron the Girlie (voiced by Lani Minella) from planet Comely. According to the on-screen descriptions, Thidney is skilled at combat whereas Shah-Ron is skilled at magic.

There are three quests:
The Good, Old Fashioned, Traditional Quest: The player wanders around the Kingdom fighting and completing various side-quests, until finally "rescue the dragon, steal the princess and kill the treasure".
The Magnificent 7-11 Quest: The player has to find and recruit 7 to 11 characters from the Kingdom in order to protect Flake town from an upcoming invasion.
The Bizarre & Slightly Twisted Quest: The player must find the Lost Lava Lamp Of The Ancient and defeat the Dark Lord, in order to save civilization.

Gameplay
The player is surrounded by many NPCs moving around, such as karate elves fighting against and ringwraiths. The player can interact with non-hostile characters, triggering a dialogue tree: conversation is handled choosing from multiple responses, leading to different directions of conversation.

Combat occurs when approaching a NPC with a weapon selected. Then all violence is covered by a cloud as seen in many cartoons, and then the two combatants walk away as if nothing had happened.

There are also magic spells to supplement the combat system, but their effects, while humorous, are largely unhelpful.

Remake
A team had begun making an unofficial remake of Kingdom O' Magic using the Adventure Game Studio engine.

References

External links

A cache of SCi's Kingdom O' Magic website

1996 video games
Adventure games
Cancelled classic Mac OS games
Cancelled PlayStation (console) games
Cancelled Sega Saturn games
DOS games
DOS-only games
Middle-earth parodies
Parody video games
Video games about reptiles
Video games developed in the United Kingdom
Video games featuring female protagonists